Fulham Cross Girls’ School  (FCGS) is a secondary school with academy status for girls aged 11–16, located in the Fulham area of the London Borough of Hammersmith and Fulham, England.

The school is part of the Fulham Cross Academy Trust, alongside Fulham Cross Academy.

Although the school does not have its own sixth form, graduating pupils have admissions priority for the sixth form operated by Fulham Cross Academy.

As of 2021, it has not been inspected by Ofsted since then, although there was a monitoring visit in 2015.

References

External links
Official website

Girls' schools in London
Secondary schools in the London Borough of Hammersmith and Fulham
Academies in the London Borough of Hammersmith and Fulham
Fulham